The 1930–31 Serie A season was won by Juventus.

Teams
Casale and Legnano had been promoted from Serie B.

Final classification

Results

Top goalscorers

References and sources
Almanacco Illustrato del Calcio - La Storia 1898-2004, Panini Edizioni, Modena, September 2005

External links
 :it:Classifica calcio Serie A italiana 1931 - Italian version with pictures and info.
  - All results with goalscorers on RSSSF Website.

Serie A seasons
Italy
1930–31 in Italian football leagues